Feel the Fire is Claudja Barry's fourth studio album, released in 1979.

Track listings
"You Can Make Me Feel the Fire" (Claudja Barry, Jörg Evers, Jürgen S. Korduletsch) – 5:43	
"Get Your Mind Made Up" (Barry, Evers, Korduletsch)
"One Night Queen" (Barry, Evers, Korduletsch) – 10:13
"It's So Nice" (Barry, Evers, Korduletsch)
"Everybody Needs Love" (Barry, Evers, Korduletsch) – 3:26	
"Wake Up and Make Love with Me" (Chas Jankel, Ian Dury) – 5:43
"Stop He's a Lover" (Barry, Korduletsch) – 6:43
"Love Seemed So Easy Without You" (Barry, Evers, Korduletsch) – 6:02

Personnel 
Jerry Rix, Julia Waters, Maxine Waters, Stephanie Spruill - backing vocals
Les Hurdle - bass
Graham Jarvis - drums
Jörg Evers - guitar, backing vocals
Kristian Schultze, Lance Dixon, Patrick Gammon - keyboards
Bob Conti - percussion
Gary Herbig - saxophone

References

External links
 Claudja Barry-Feel The Fire at Discogs

1979 albums
Claudja Barry albums